Cleodora may refer to:

 Cleodora (plant) a section of the genus Croton
 In Greek mythology: 
 One of the Daughters of Danaus
 Kleodora, one of the Thriae